Juan Carlos Osorio Arbeláez (born 8 June 1961) is a Colombian professional football manager and former footballer who played as a midfielder.

Osorio began his playing career with Deportivo Pereira in 1982, and went on to play for Brazilian club Internacional in 1984 before returning to his native Colombia a year later, ultimately retiring in 1987 at the age of 26 due to injury.

Nicknamed El Recreacionista (The Recreationist in Spanish) due to his unorthodox training methods, Osorio held various assistant coaching jobs before beginning his managerial career in 2006 with Millonarios, moving abroad the following year to manage Major League Soccer teams Chicago Fire and New York Red Bulls, leading the latter to their first conference title in 2008. He managed Once Caldas in 2010 and led them to a league title, as well as managing Atlético Nacional in 2012 and winning numerous championships. In October 2015 he was named as manager of the Mexico national team, a post he held until July 2018.

Early life
After playing for Deportivo Pereira and Internacional, Osorio moved to the USA and represented University of New Haven's New Haven Chargers from 1985 to 1986. He graduated from Southern Connecticut State University in 1990 with a B.A. in Exercise Science. Osorio also holds a diploma in Science and Football from Liverpool John Moores University, a UEFA "A" coaching license from the English FA, and a coaching certificate from the Royal Netherlands Football Association.

Managerial career

Assistant
Juan Carlos Osorio began his coaching career during the 1998–1999 season joining the Staten Island Vipers as their assistant/conditioning coach. He would then join the MetroStars staff during the 2000 season under Octavio Zambrano. He would go on to join English club Manchester City as conditioning coach in June 2001.

Millonarios
In 2006, Osorio started his career as a manager when he was hired by Millonarios in his native Colombia. He led the Bogotá-based club to an 11-6-7 record during the 2007 Finalizacion (closing) season and a fourth-place finish out of 18 teams in the Mustang Cup. In 2007, he was the recipient of the DIMAYOR (División Mayor del Fútbol Colombiano) Excellence in Football Coaching award becoming the first coach to win that award in his first year of coaching.

Chicago Fire
In July 2007 he was appointed manager of Major League Soccer side Chicago Fire. He took over a last-place team and led them to a playoff spot. He also helped Chicago orchestrate a first-round series victory against D.C. United, which entered the playoffs with the best record in MLS. On 10 December, the Chicago Fire announced that Osorio had resigned due to "family reasons". In his short time with the Fire, Osorio went 6-3-6 in the league, 7-5-7 across all competitions and led the team to the Conference Final for the sixth time in nine seasons.

New York Red Bulls

Eight days after resigning from the Chicago Fire, Osorio was hired by the New York Red Bulls. The decision came after Red Bulls and Fire reached an agreement on compensation for Osorio. The Red Bulls had an up and down season in Osorio's first season in charge of the club. After a promising start, the club qualified for the playoffs on the final day of the season and was seeded as a wild card into the Western Conference bracket. In the 2008 MLS Cup Playoffs, Osorio lead the club to their first ever MLS Cup final, defeating defending champion Houston Dynamo (4–1 on aggregate) and Real Salt Lake 1–0. In the MLS Cup final, the Red Bulls lost 3–1 to Columbus Crew. In his second season with the club, Osorio guided them to one of the worst records in league history, finishing with a 2-16-4 record. In his two seasons at the club Osorio went 12-27-13, the worst mark in the league during that period of time. The club also suffered an embarrassing set-back when they were eliminated by W Connection in the preliminary round of the CONCACAF Champions League. Due to mounting pressure, Osorio resigned from his post as coach of the New York Red Bulls on 21 August 2009.

Once Caldas
After leaving New York, on 18 November 2009 Osorio was hired by Once Caldas. After taking charge of a team that was in danger of relegation Osorio helped Once Caldas to a league title in 2010. In 44 matches in charge, he recorded a record of 23 victories, 8 draws, and 13 losses. In January 2011 it was reported that Osorio would be leaving Once Caldas to take charge of the Honduras national team.

On 2 February 2011, Osorio was officially named as the new coach of the Honduras national team and to lead them during the qualifying rounds of the 2014 FIFA World Cup. However, Once Caldas announced Osorio contractually could not be released until June to assume his role with Honduras. Due to this, Honduras' football federation announced they could not wait until June, subsequently ending the negotiations.

Puebla
On 15 November, the president of Mexican club Puebla Roberto Henaine announced via Twitter that Juan Carlos Osorio would be manager, following Sergio Bueno departure.  He resigned on 22 March 2012 due to poor performances, leaving the club with a 2-2-3 record.

São Paulo
On 26 May 2015, Osorio was confirmed as the new manager of São Paulo FC, signing a two-year contract. He was presented on 1 June and made his debut five days later, in a 2–0 victory against Grêmio at Estádio do Morumbi.

Mexico

On 14 October 2015, after heavy media speculation, Osorio was confirmed as head coach of the Mexico national football team, signing a three-year contract. He was the twelfth coach appointed in nine years, and the first Colombian. Though information of his salary went undisclosed, Spanish newspaper El País reported that Osorio would receive an annual salary of USD$1.2 million, 60 percent less than what former manager Miguel Herrera earned during his time in charge.

On 13 November, Osorio won his first game in charge of Mexico, defeating El Salvador 3–0 at Estadio Azteca in their opening match of the 2018 World Cup fourth-round qualifiers. Mexico finished at the top of Group A with 16 points, advancing to the hexagonal round.

Osorio led Mexico to the Copa América Centenario on a 16-match unbeaten streak that began in June 2015. Mexico placed first in their group with 7 points, defeating Uruguay, Jamaica, and drawing with Venezuela. In the quarterfinal match against Chile, the team suffered a 7–0 defeat, ending the unbeaten streak at 22 games. After the match, Osorio apologized to Mexico's fans for what he described as an "embarrassment" and "an accident of soccer".

Following Mexico's participation at the 2017 FIFA Confederations Cup, where the team finished in fourth place, Osorio was suspended by FIFA for six games after using insulting words and displaying aggressive and confrontational behavior towards officials during the third place play-off match against Portugal.

On 2 September, following their 1–0 victory over Panama, Mexico secured their qualification to the 2018 FIFA World Cup. On 6 October, Mexico defeated Trinidad and Tobago 3–1, taking their points tally to 21, thus assuring Mexico will finish at the top of the qualification table for the first time since 1997.

In March 2018, it was reported that Osorio had rejected an offer from the Mexican Football Federation to extend his contract with the Mexico national team. Later, in July 2018, Osorio resigned from his position as Mexico head coach.

Paraguay
On 3 September 2018, the Paraguayan Football Association appointed Osorio as manager of the Paraguay national football team to face the 2019 Copa América and the CONMEBOL qualifiers for the 2022 FIFA World Cup in Qatar. A mutual termination of the contract occurred on 13 February 2019.

Atlético Nacional
On 10 June 2019, Juan Carlos Osorio was confirmed as manager of Atlético Nacional. Osorio's second spell with the club ended on 1 November 2020 after 20 wins, 18 draws and 12 losses, as he was sacked following a 3–0 defeat to Nacional's rivals Millonarios.

América de Cali
On 16 June 2021, Osorio was announced as the new manager of América de Cali.

Managerial statistics
Statistics accurate as of match played 27 March 2022

Honours

Manager
New York Red Bulls
MLS Western Conference: 2008
Once Caldas
Categoría Primera A: 2010-II
Atlético Nacional
Categoría Primera A: 2013-I, 2013-II, 2014-I
Copa Colombia: 2012, 2013
Superliga Colombiana: 2012

References

External links
 

1961 births
Living people
People from Santa Rosa de Cabal
Alumni of Liverpool John Moores University
Colombian footballers
Deportivo Pereira footballers
Sport Club Internacional players
Once Caldas footballers
Colombian expatriate footballers
Expatriate footballers in Brazil
Colombian expatriate sportspeople in Brazil
Expatriate soccer players in the United States
Colombian expatriate sportspeople in the United States
Association football midfielders

Colombian football managers

Manchester City F.C. non-playing staff
Millonarios F.C. managers
Chicago Fire FC coaches
New York Red Bulls coaches
Once Caldas managers
Club Puebla managers
Atlético Nacional managers
São Paulo FC managers
Mexico national football team managers
Paraguay national football team managers
América de Cali managers

Categoría Primera A managers
Major League Soccer coaches
Campeonato Brasileiro Série A managers
Copa América Centenario managers
2017 FIFA Confederations Cup managers
2018 FIFA World Cup managers

Colombian expatriate sportspeople in England
Colombian expatriate football managers
Expatriate soccer managers in the United States
Expatriate football managers in Brazil
Expatriate football managers in Mexico
Colombian expatriate sportspeople in Mexico
Expatriate football managers in Paraguay
Colombian expatriate sportspeople in Paraguay